The Iveco VM 90 is an Italian multirole military vehicle. It is a hybrid, somewhere between a truck and tactical SUV, manufactured by Iveco,  on the base of the Iveco Daily. From this version was subsequently also derived the 40.10WM civilian version, designed for law enforcement and civil protection.

It is in service in the Italian Army in three versions:

 VM 90T Torpedo, a tactical vehicle with a tarpaulin covered rear.
 VM 90P Protetto (Protected), fitted with a fully armored body.
 Ambulanza VM 90 (Ambulance VM 90), fitted with an ambulance body.

The Torpedo version is also supplied with ground forces of the Italian Navy and the Italian Air Force. The VM 90 is powered by a diesel engine.

Versions

Torpedo

The Torpedo version is the basic version, with rear tilt and capable of carrying 10 men, besides the driver. This version is suitable for transportation tactical troop, but does not have an armor, among other uses, there is the possibility of pulling small artillery pieces or serve as a tactical command post.

It is used by all departments of the Italian Army since the service was used in all missions outside the box.

Features

 Displacement: 2499cc
 Cylinders: 4
 Power: kW: 73.5, HP: 100 at 3,800 rpm
 Length: 4500 mm
 Width: 2000 mm
 Height: 2483 mm
 Transmission gears: 5 manual
 Strength: Full
 Speed: 102 km / h
 Positions: 1 + 8
 Range: 800 km

Protected

This variant is intended to deal with the need to ensure greater protection for personnel. The secure version has a full armour, with a cockpit that replaces the rear platform with tarpaulin version of Torpedo. The armoured cockpit is equipped with rear door windows and holes to use the arms without exposing himself, as well as trap-gun or other weapon.

The vehicle has been criticised for being unsafe for its crew, as the armour does not offer high protection, but was adopted into service anyway as a temporary solution pending the entry into service of the VBL Puma. The vehicle was employed in Somalia, during Operation Restore Hope, and in Iraq during Operation Antica Babilonia.
Due to its evident lack of protection offered, the VM 90P has never been loved by Italian military personnel; because of a vague resemblance, Italian soldiers "lovingly" nicknamed it as the "scarrafone" (big ugly cockroach).

At that time the deadliest incident involving this kind of armoured vehicle took place: on 27 April 2006 in Nasiriya an IED exploded under a VM90P with 5 servicemen on board. Three of them were killed instantly due to thermal shock and the other two were critically burned and died thereafter.

Features

 Displacement: 2499 cm 3
 Cylinders: 4
 Power: kW: 75.7 (HP: 103) at 3800 rpm
 Length: 4680 mm
 Width: 1980 mm
 Height: 2380 mm
 Transmission gears: 5 speed manual
 Strength: Full
 Positions: 1 + 6
 Range: 800 km.

Ambulance

The ambulance version of the VM 90 is a variant of the Torpedo suited to carry injured off-road and tactical level, which will join the ambulance version of the Fiat Ducato, also supplied all Italian Army.

Features

 Displacement: 2499 cm 3
 Cylinders: 4
 Power: kW: 75.7 (HP: 103) at 3800 rpm
 Length: 4880 mm
 Width: 2040 mm
 Height: 2200 mm
 Transmission gears: 5 manual
 Strength: Full
 Top speed: 110 km / h
 Positions: 3 front, 1 rear, 2 stretchers
 Range: 800 km.

Operators

Current operators
  : 250 (Police & Military use)
 
 
 
  : 2879 (manufactured under license by Western Star)
  : produced in China by Naveco as the Nanjing NJ2046.
  : production under license since 1998, as Tiger Kader 120: 650 + 130 Ambulance version
  : 200
 
  : few donated by Italy 2018
  : NJ2046 variants from China seen on the State Flag Day parade in 2022
 
  : 29
 
  : 3
  : 2200
 
 : 17 Iveco VM 90P Protetto (Republican National Guard) and dozens of Ambulance versions operated by Portuguese Army. 4 have been sent to Ukraine.
 
  : donated by Italy March 2015.
 
 
 : 5. 4 sent by Portugal in response to the 2022 Russian invasion of Ukraine. These were previously used in and modified for the Iraq War by the National Republican Guard (Portugal). 1 procured and brought in May 2022 by volunteers.

Civilian operators
  (Gendarmería Nacional)
  (Federal Police)
 : Bulgaria Gendarmerie

Foreign production

Western Star, then of Canada, produced a licensed version of the VM90 for the Canadian Forces during the 1990s called the LSVW.

See also

 Iveco Daily
 Iveco LMV
 Rayton-Fissore Magnum

References

External links

 Civil version VM90  at Vigili del Fuoco site.
 Italian Army:
 Torpedo
 Protector
 Ambulance

Polizia di Stato
VM90
Military vehicles of Italy